Jamie Walsh is a former professional rugby league footballer who played in the 1970s.

Playing career

BBC2 Floodlit Trophy Final appearances
Jamie Walsh played , i.e. number 5, and scored a try in Castleford's 12-4 victory over Leigh in the 1976 BBC2 Floodlit Trophy Final during the 1976–77 season at Hilton Park, Leigh on Tuesday 14 December 1976.

References

External links
Search for "Walsh" at rugbyleagueproject.org
Jamie Walsh Memory Box Search at archive.castigersheritage.com

Living people
Castleford Tigers players
English rugby league players
Hull Kingston Rovers players
Place of birth missing (living people)
Rugby league wingers
Year of birth missing (living people)